This is a list of episodes of the Japanese animated TV series .

Overview
It began airing its 26-episode run on NHK BS-2 on October 4, 2003, and ended on February 23, 2004. Produced and animated by Sunrise, it was directed by Gorō Taniguchi and scripted by Ichirō Ōkouchi (both of whom would later reunite in 2006 to work on the Sunrise original production Code Geass). The anime began development and production before the end of the manga serialization. In the beginning and middle of the series, the writing and production staff only had the first three volumes of the manga as source. In order to fill the entire 26-episode run of the anime, new characters, new settings and new relationships between characters were made in order to increase dramatic tension, reinforce themes introduced in the manga, and introduce new themes that were compatible with the manga. While the manga deals more with existential themes, and humanity's relationship with space, the anime further expands the political elements of the story.

The music of Planetes is a mixture of traditional orchestral music, supplemented by chorals, several uses of a theremin, and traditional Japanese woodwinds (e.g. Shakuhachi). The music score was composed by Kōtarō Nakagawa and produced by Victor Entertainment. The opening theme is "Dive in the Sky" by Mikio Sakai, and the ending themes are "Wonderful Life" by Mikio Sakai for episodes 1-25 and "Planetes" by Hitomi Kuroishi for episode 26. There are two insert songs, "A Secret of the Moon" by Hitomi Kuroishi, used in various episodes, and "Thanks My Friend" by Mikio Sakai used in episode 13.

Episode list

See also
Planetes
List of Planetes chapters

References
Specific

General
 

Planetes
Episodes